Sydösterbotten is a subdivision of Ostrobothnia and one of the Sub-regions of Finland since 2009.

References

Sub-regions of Finland
Geography of Ostrobothnia (region)